George Davidson Burrows (born 22 June 1998) is an English cricketer. He made his first-class debut on 22 August 2020, for Lancashire in the 2020 Bob Willis Trophy. In November 2021, he was released by Lancashire. In March 2022, Burrows was signed by Sussex for a month-long contract for the start of the 2022 cricket season.

References

External links
 

1998 births
Living people
Cricketers from Wigan
English cricketers
Lancashire cricketers